Natalie Grant is the eponymous debut studio album by Contemporary Christian music singer Natalie Grant. It was released on April 14, 1999, through Benson Records.

Critical reception
New Release Today stated "Just as Jesus touched the untouchable with the gospel, Natalie reaches out to the unreachable with her pure voice and powerful message. She'll challenge you to expand your witness in songs like 'I Am Not Alone', 'There Is a God', and more."

Track listing

Personnel 
 Jackie Patillo – executive producer 
 Brown Bannister – producer 
 Brian Tankersley – producer, recording, mixing 
 Sandy Jenkins – recording assistant, mix assistant 
 Hank Nirider – recording assistant, mix assistant 
 Hank Williams – mastering at MasterMix (Nashville, Tennessee)
 Traci Sterling Bishir – production manager 
 Terry Watson – A&R coordinator 
 Elizabeth Workman – art direction, design 
 Dominick Guillemont – photography 
 Troi Solarek – stylist 
 Patrick Defontbruen – make-up 
 Tracy Moyer – hair stylist 
 Mitchell/Janson Management – management

Release history

References

1999 debut albums
Natalie Grant albums